The 2023 Campeonato Baiano (officially the Campeonato Baiano de Futebol Profissional Série “A” – Edição 2023) is the 119th edition of Bahia's top professional football league organized by FBF. The competition began on 10 January and will end on 9 April 2023. Atlético de Alagoinhas were the defending champions but they were eliminated in the group stage.

The champions will qualify for 2024 Copa do Brasil and 2024 Copa do Nordeste. The runners-up and third place will also qualify for 2024 Copa do Brasil.

Format
In the first stage, each team will play the other nine teams in a single round-robin tournament. Top four teams will advance to the semi-finals. The bottom two teams will be relegated to the 2024 Campeonato Baiano Série B.

The final stage will be played on a home-and-away two-legged basis with the best overall performance team hosting the second leg. If tied on aggregate, the penalty shoot-out will be used to determine the winners.

Champions will qualify for the 2024 Copa do Brasil and 2024 Copa do Nordeste, while runners-up and third place will qualify for the 2024 Copa do Brasil. Top two teams not already qualified for 2024 Série A, Série B or Série C will qualify for 2024 Campeonato Brasileiro Série D. The champions of the 2023 Copa Governador will earn the third Série D berth.

Teams

First stage

Group 1

Final stage

Bracket

Semi-finals

|}

Group 2

Bahia qualified for the finals.

Group 3

Jacuipense qualified for the finals.

Finals

|}

Group 4

References 

Campeonato Baiano
Baiano
2023 in Brazilian football